Parkton is a ghost town in Inman Township in Otter Tail County, Minnesota, United States.

History
Parkton had a station of the Northern Pacific Railway.

Notes
Possibly just a train station name known as Parkton Station - see Inman Twp. Map on the westernmost edge of section 5, as well as the northwest corner of the Inman township section of the Ottertail County Outline Map.

Former populated places in Minnesota
Former populated places in Otter Tail County, Minnesota